Cereal Killer Soundtrack is an album released by comedy metal/punk group Green Jellÿ in 1993. It is the soundtrack to their video album, Cereal Killer. It is the first album in which the band used the name Green Jellÿ although early copies featured the Green Jellö name.

Legal issues and re-release
Cereal Killer Soundtrack was originally released under the band name of Green Jellö. However, as their fame grew with the release of the popular "Three Little Pigs", Kraft Foods Inc., owner of the Jell-O trademark, claimed that Green Jellÿ were in violation of the trademark, forcing a change of the band's name. As a result, an updated version of Cereal Killer Soundtrack was released bearing the Green Jellÿ name (also changing the name of the last track from "Green Jellö Theme Song" to "Green Jellÿ Theme Song") later in the same year.

Also on the re-release, the guitar riff on the song "Electric Harley House (of Love)" that borrows from Metallica's "Enter Sandman" was edited out.

The lyrics to the song "Obey the Cowgod" make a reference to Beefcake the Mighty, bass player for the band Gwar, who taught Green Jellÿ how to make their latex costumes.

Track listing
All tracks by Green Jellÿ except where noted

Personnel 
 Bill Manspeaker (as Moronic Dicktator & Marshall Staxx) - vocals
 Joe Cannizzaro (as Dunderhed) - vocals
 Gary Helsinger (as Hotsy Menshot) - vocals
 Greg Reynard (as Reason Clean) - vocals
 Steven Shenar (as Sven Seven) - guitars
 Michael Bloomquist (as Rootin') - bass
 Joe Russo (as Mother Eucker) - bass
 Danny Carey (as Danny Longlegs) - drums
 Maynard James Keenan - guest vocals on "Three Little Pigs"
 Pauly Shore - guest vocals on "Three Little Pigs"
 Kymmee O'Donnell (as Sadistica) – art direction, art producer, vocals on "House Me Teenage Rave"
 Caroline Jester (as Jella Tin) - vocals on "House Me Teenage Rave"
 C.J. Buscaglia – guitars, producer
 Lee Hammond – creative director
 Sylvia Massy – producer, engineer, mixing
 Les Claypool - guest vocals on "Three Little Pigs"

Charts

References

External links
 Green Jelly Cereal Killer Soundtrack 

1993 albums
Green Jellÿ albums
Zoo Entertainment (record label) albums